Zdeněk Koubek (born Zdena "Zdeňka" Koubková, 8 December 1913 – 12 June 1986) was a track athlete from Czechoslovakia. He won two medals at the 1934 Women's World Games and several national titles in the 100–800 m running, long jump and high jump, and set a few world records in running events. In 1936, he underwent female to male gender reassignment surgery and retired from athletics.

Biography
Koubek was born in Paskov, in a family of eight siblings. Soon after his birth, the family moved to Brno, where he finished school and started training in athletics. Koubek continued his education and training in Prague.

In 1934 he won five national titles, in the 100 m, 200 m and 800 m running, high jump and long jump. On 14 June 1934 he set his first world record, in the 800 m at 2:16.4. His next world record came in the medley relay (2×100 m, 200 m and 800 m), at 3:14.4. Later in August, Koubek won the 800 m event at the 1934 Women's World Games, in a world record time of 2:12.4, and finished third in the long jump with a national record of 5.70 m.

In 1935 Koubek retired from competitions and for six months toured the United States. The next year, he underwent gender reassignment surgery and changed his name. He abandoned athletics and a potential coaching career, and only after World War II did he join the team of his brother Jaroslav and played rugby for a local club.

Koubek spent his later years living with his wife in Prague, where he died aged 72. A 1935 novel Zdenin světový rekord (Zdena's world record) by Lída Merlínová is based on his early life and career.

References

1913 births
1986 deaths
Czech female middle-distance runners
Czech long jumpers
Intersex men
Intersex sportspeople
Sex verification in sports
Czechoslovak LGBT people
LGBT track and field athletes
Women's World Games medalists
Czech LGBT sportspeople
Czech transgender people
People from Frýdek-Místek District
20th-century Czech LGBT people
Sportspeople from the Moravian-Silesian Region